Marina Umaschi Bers is the Augustus Long Professor of Education at Boston College. Bers holds a secondary appointment  in Boston College's Department of Computer Science. Bers directs the interdisciplinary DevTech Research Group, which she started in 2001 at Tufts University. Her research involves the design and study of innovative learning technologies to promote children’s positive development. She is known for her work in the field of early childhood computer science with projects of national and international visibility. Bers is the co-creator of the free ScratchJr programming language, used by 35 million children, and the creator of the KIBO robotic kit, which has no screens or keyboards.

Education 
Marina Umaschi Bers went to Buenos Aires University in Argentina and received her undergraduate degree in Social Communications (1993). In 1994, she earned a Master’s degree in Educational Media and Technology from Boston University; she also has an M.S. from Massachusetts Institute of Technology. In 2001, she earned a Ph.D. from the MIT Media Laboratory working under the mentorship of Seymour Papert. In 2001 Bers created her research group, the Developmental Technologies, or DevTech, at the Eliot-Pearson Department of Child Development at Tufts University. In 2018 she was named the chair of the Eliot-Pearson Dept. of Child Development.  In 2022 she moved to Boston College as the August Long Professor of Education at the Lynch School of Education and Human Development. Bers received an appointment in Boston College's Department of Computer Science and is an affiliated faculty with the Schiller Institute for Integrated Science and Society.

Bers co-founded KinderLab Robotics in 2013, and has worked with WGBH-TV and PBS on content for children's broadcasting.

Research and work
Bers’ research centers around the potential of technology to foster the development of children. Her early work examined storytelling and language in children, robotics in early childhood education, and the development of values in virtual environments. In 2012 she developed the TangibleK robotics program to teach young children about the world of technology. Bers developed the ScratchJr programming language collaboratively with Mitch Resnick, Paula Bonta, and Brian Silverman. ScratchJr targets children from ages 5 to 7, and is an offshoot of Scratch which is used to teach programming to children from 8 to 16 computer programming. Bers also works to train childhood educators on the use of technology in the classroom and develops curriculum that can be used to teach programming and computational thinking. She developed the KIBO robot kit, a robot that young children can program with wooden blocks and serves as a tool to teach children computer programming.

Published books
Bers, M. U (2012). Designing Digital Experiences for Positive Youth Development: From Playpen to Playground. Oxford.
Bers, M. U & Resnick, M. (2015). The Official ScratchJr Book. No Starch Press.
Bers, M. U & Sullivan, A. (2018) The Official ScratchJr Coding Cards. No Starch Press.
Bers, M. U. (2018). Coding as a Playground: Programming and Coding in the Early Childhood Classroom. Routledge.

Awards and honors
In 2005, Bers received the Presidential Early Career Award for Scientists and Engineers (PECASE), the highest honor given by the U.S. government to outstanding investigators. She also received a National Science Foundation (NSF)‘s Young Investigator’s Career Award, and the American Educational Research Association (AERA) Jan Hawkins Award for Early Career Contributions to Humanistic Research and Scholarship in Learning Technologies. In 2015, Bers was chosen as one of the recipients of the Boston Business Journal’s Women to Watch in Science and Technology awards, and in 2016, Bers received the Outstanding Faculty Contribution to Graduate Student Studies award at Tufts University. She was elected fellow of the American Educational Research Association (AERA) in 2022.

References

External links 

, January 20, 2015 
 2020 interview with Bers

Tufts University faculty
University of Buenos Aires alumni
Boston University alumni
Massachusetts Institute of Technology alumni
Women computer scientists
Educational researchers
Living people
21st-century women
Year of birth missing (living people)
Recipients of the Presidential Early Career Award for Scientists and Engineers
Women linguists
21st-century linguists